The discography of Italian singer-songwriter Sabrina Salerno consists of 6 studio albums, 7 compilation albums and 28 singles.

Studio albums

Compilation albums

Singles

Guest appearances

References

External links 

Discographies of Italian artists
Pop music discographies